Five Million Look for an Heir is a 1938 German comedy film directed by Carl Boese and starring Heinz Rühmann, Leny Marenbach and Oskar Sima. It was based on a novel by Harald Baumgarten. It was shot at the Halensee and Tempelhof Studios in Berlin. The film's sets were designed by the art directors Alfred Bütow and Willi Herrmann.

Plot 
The wealthy American uncle of vacuum cleaner salesman Peter Pett stipulated in his will that Peter may only inherit the five million dollars left to him if he is happily married. Otherwise, the five million should go to Peter's Scottish cousin Patrick.

Commissioned by the executor, Mister Blubberboom comes to Europe to see if Peter is happy with his wife Hix too. But the insidious Blubberboom brings Peter to New York without his wife and wants to have the beautiful Mabel appears as his wife at the performance there.

But Patrick, who looks confusingly like his cousin, also wants the money. He appears at Hix and travels with her to New York as well. In the Atlantic Hotel, everyone meets without meeting at first. There are confusing scenes, and even as a viewer it is difficult to tell which of the two Petts you are looking at. Eventually, Blubberboom reveals himself to be a gangster and hides Hix to avoid meeting her husband. But in the end, Hix and Peter finally meet, hug, and this obvious happiness also decides about the millions. But Patrick doesn't go away empty-handed either: he won Mabel's heart.

Cast
 Heinz Rühmann as Peter Pett / Patrick Pett
 Leny Marenbach as Mabel
 Vera von Langen as Hix
 Oskar Sima as Blubberboom
 Heinz Salfner as Gould
 Olga Limburg as Vorstandsmitglied
 Claire Reigbert as Miss Hopkins, Vorstandsmitglied der Vereinigten Frauen- und Sittlichkeitsverbände
 Albert Florath as Mister Bucklespring
 Valy Arnheim as Mister Harris
 William Huch as Mister Kirkwood
 Anton Pointner as Hotelportier
 Otto Stoeckel as Arzt im Dachgarten
 Hermann Pfeiffer as Onkel Jim - NBC Radio-Reporter

References

Bibliography

External links 
 

1938 films
Films of Nazi Germany
German comedy films
German black-and-white films
1938 comedy films
1930s German-language films
Films directed by Carl Boese
Films based on German novels
Films set in the United States
Terra Film films
1930s German films
Films shot at Tempelhof Studios
Films shot at Halensee Studios